The Killie Campbell Africana Library is a library of Africana at the University of KwaZulu-Natal. It is named after Killie Campbell (1881–1965) who bequeathed her collection of Africana to the (then) University of Natal.

References 

Libraries in South Africa
University of KwaZulu-Natal